Jacob Lindley (June 13, 1774 – January 29, 1857) was the first president of Ohio University, between 1809 and 1822.

Life
Lindley was educated at Thaddeus Dod's log college (later Jefferson College) and College of New Jersey.

He was one of the founders of the Franklin Literary Society at Jefferson College.

Jacob and Hannah's eldest child was Daniel Lindley who was born in Pennsylvania on 24 August 1801. He was a missionary in South Africa. He and his wife Lucy founded the Inanda Seminary School in 1869. Lindley was pastor to the Voortrekkers in the first Dutch Reformed Church in the Orange Free State.

References

External links

Presidents of Ohio University
Washington & Jefferson College alumni
1774 births
1857 deaths